This is a list of books which have been featured on BBC Radio 4's Book of the Week during 2015.

January
 Different Every Time: The Authorised Biography of Robert Wyatt – Marcus O'Dair
 Reaching down the Rabbit Hole – Dr Allan H Ropper and Brian D Burrell
 Epilogue: A Memoir – Will Boast
 Nothing Is True and Everything Is Possible – Peter Pomerantsev

February
 Young Eliot – Robert Crawford
 Leaving before the Rains Come – Alexandra Fuller
 Shop Girl – Mary Portas

March
 Girl in the Dark – Anna Lyndsey
 Birth of a Theorem – Cédric Villani
 The Utopia Experiment – Dylan Evans
 Boundless – Kathleen Winter

April
 Landmarks – Robert Macfarlane
 The Story of Alice – Robert Douglas-Fairhurst
 The Shepherd's Life – James Rebanks
 Skyfaring: A Journey with a Pilot – Mark Vanhoenacker
 Words Without Music – Philip Glass

May
 Year of the Fat Knight – Antony Sher
 The Weather Experiment – Peter Moore
 Gold Fever – Steve Boggan
 Channel Shore – Tom Fort

June
 Ghettoside – Jill Leovy
 Adventures in Human Being – Gavin Francis
 Walking Away – Simon Armitage
 Keeping an Eye Open – Julian Barnes

July
 Queen of the Desert – Georgina Howell
 All Day Long: A Portrait of Britain at Work – Joanna Biggs
 Sixty Degrees North – Malachy Tallack
 On the Move – Oliver Sacks
 Long Time No See – Hannah Lowe

August
 Spirals in Time: The Secret Life and Curious Afterlife of Seashells – Dr Helen Scales
 Romantic Outlaws: The Extraordinary Lives of Mary Wollstonecraft and Mary Shelley – Charlotte Gordon
 A Mountain of Crumbs – Elena Gorokhova

September
 Deep South: Four Seasons on Back Roads – Paul Theroux, read by Henry Goodman
 Maggie Smith: A Biography – Michael Coveney, read by Bill Nighy
 Nemesis: One Man and the Battle for Rio – Misha Glenny read by author
 The White Road – Edmund de Waal read by Julian Rhind-Tutt

October
 Margaret Thatcher: The Authorized Biography, Volume Two: Everything She Wants – Charles Moore (journalist) read by Nicholas Farrell
 1606: William Shakespeare and the Year of Lear – James Shapiro, read by Ian McDiarmid
 John le Carré: The Biography – Adam Sisman, read by Stephen Boxer

November
 Charlotte Bronte: A Life by Claire Harman, read by Hattie Morahan
 Every Time a Friend Succeeds Something Inside Me Dies: The Life of Gore Vidal by Jay Parini, read by Toby Jones
 Unfaithful Music and Disappearing Ink by Elvis Costello, read by the author
 Living On Paper: Letters from Iris Murdoch 193-1995 edited by Avril Horner and Anne Rowe, read by Imogen Stubbs and Nigel Anthony
 Railways – Nation, Network and People by Simon Bradley, read by Stephen Tompkinson

December
 Alive, Alive Oh! And Other Things That Matter by Diana Athill, read by Stephanie Cole
 My History by Antonia Fraser
 The Man Who Made Things Out of Trees by Robert Penn
 The House by the Lake: A Story of Germany by Thomas Harding

References

Lists of books
Lists of radio series episodes